Superstar is a UK talent search, looking for the lead role in a production of the 1971 rock opera Jesus Christ Superstar. The series started on 7 July 2012 on ITV and was presented by Amanda Holden.

In the final, on 25 July 2012, 31-year-old Ben Forster was chosen as Jesus to perform the role in the UK arena tour starting in September 2012. 24-year-old Rory Taylor came in second place.

The Team
The series was presented by Amanda Holden. The Panel consisted of Andrew Lloyd Webber, Jason Donovan, Dawn French and Melanie C. David Grindrod and Will Burton led the casting team, with Yvie Burnett serving as the vocal coach.

Format

Nationwide auditions

The Nationwide auditions began in March 2012 visiting London, Dublin, Belfast, Manchester, Glasgow and Cardiff. The judges are Andrew Lloyd Webber, Melanie C, Jason Donovan and David Grindrod. Host Amanda Holden was on hand for the auditionees.

Grindrod judged the nationwide auditions and was joined by Donovan and Melanie C at the 'Callback' round held at the O2 Academy in Brixton, London. Over 100 contestants were invited to the 'Callback' round in London. Lloyd Webber watched all the performances from a balcony at the side of the stage.

Superstar Island
The final 41 contestants are invited to 'Superstar Island' (Osea Island in Essex) for a week of training. Jonathan Ansell is a notable contestant who failed to pass this stage of the show.

Final rounds
The final 30 contestants were invited to Lloyd Webber's villa in Majorca. After 10 were eliminated on arrival, the remaining contestants performed again in front of Lloyd Webber.

The next day, the contestants travelled back to Great Britain via coach (with the journey taking 25 hours) and performed a final time in front of the panel, with an accompanying band onstage, for a place in the live shows.

Live shows
The Live show stages of the search were judged by Melanie C, Jason Donovan, Dawn French and Andrew Lloyd Webber. The live shows were broadcast live from Fountain Studios in Wembley and took place over nine nights (excluding Saturday 21 and Sunday 22 July). The final was held on 25 July 2012.

The contestants perform on the first live show with the results of the public vote announced during the following night's show. The two contestants with the lowest votes competed in the Sing-Off to stay in the competition. After the performance, Lloyd Webber then decided which potential Jesus to keep in the contest. The saved Jesuses could be seen on the "Stairway to Heaven". The eliminated Jesus(es) then "walks into the light" and leaves the stage.

Finalists

* at time of competition

Results summary
Colour key

Live show details

Night 1 (15 July 2012)
Group performance: "Superstar" (Andrew Lloyd Webber)

Sing-Off (Night 2)

Night 2 (16 July 2012)

Sing-Off (Night 3)

Night 3 (17 July 2012)
Group performance: "Sgt. Pepper's Lonely Hearts Club Band" (The Beatles)

Sing-Off (Night 4)

 Before the performance, Lloyd Webber decided not to eliminate either of them until he had seen the solo performances they had prepared for the night. They both performed on Night 4 with the elimination at the end of the show.

Night 4 (18 July 2012)
Group performance: "Viva la Vida" (Coldplay)
Guest performance: "Ruby" (Kaiser Chiefs)

Night 5 (19 July 2012)
Group performance: "Livin' on a Prayer" (Bon Jovi)
Guest performance: "Baby Come Home" (Scissor Sisters)

Sing-Off:

Night 6 (20 July 2012)
Group performance: "Pinball Wizard" (The Who)
Guest performance: "30 Minute Love Affair" (Paloma Faith)

Sing-Off:

Night 7 (23 July 2012)
Group performance: "We Are Young" (fun.)
Guest performance: "Greatest Day" (Gary Barlow, featuring Final 5)

Sing-Off

Night 8: Semi-final (24 July 2012)
Group performance: "What's the Buzz" (Andrew Lloyd Webber and Tim Rice)
Guest performance: "Habanera" (Katherine Jenkins)

Sing-Off

Night 9: Final (25 July 2012)
Group performances: "Hosanna" and "Gethsemane" (Andrew Lloyd Webber and Tim Rice)
Guest performance: "I Don't Know How to Love Him" (Melanie C, featuring Andrew Lloyd Webber)

The Arena Tour
The tour travelled across the country from 21 September until 21 October 2012 and toured in the following venues: London O2 Arena, Glasgow SECC, Newcastle Metro Radio Arena, Manchester Arena, Motorpoint Arena Cardiff, National Indoor Arena Birmingham, Belfast Odyssey, The O2 Dublin, Echo Arena Liverpool, Nottingham Capital FM and Motorpoint Arena Sheffield. Joining Forster was comedian Tim Minchin as Judas Iscariot, Melanie C as Mary Magdalene, BBC Radio 1 DJ Chris Moyles as King Herod Antipas, Alexander Hanson as Pontius Pilate, Pete Gallagher as Caiaphas, Gerard Bentall as Annas, Michael Pickering as Peter, and Giovanni Spano as Simon Zealotes.

The tour resumed in March 2013 in Australia with Forster, Minchin, and Melanie C reprising their respective roles. Australian TV personality Andrew O'Keefe played the role of King Herod for the Australian leg of the tour, with New Zealand born Jon Stevens (who played Judas in the 1992 Australian arena tour and the 1994 theatre production) playing Pilate. Superstar runner-up Rory Taylor appeared as Simon Zealotes.

The North American tour was to commence on 9 June starting in New Orleans, with stops including Toronto, Chicago, Los Angeles, New York City, and more before ending in Philadelphia on 17 August. This leg of the tour was to feature Forster reprising his role as Jesus, Brandon Boyd of rock band Incubus as Judas, Destiny's Child singer Michelle Williams as Mary Magdalene, former 'N Sync singer JC Chasez as Pilate, and former Sex Pistols and Public Image Ltd lead singer John Lydon as King Herod. On 30 May 2014, the tour was cancelled, mostly due to poor ticket sales.

Reception

Official ratings are supplied by the UK Programme Ratings website, BARB.

Ratings

References

External links

2012 British television series debuts
2012 British television series endings
2010s British reality television series
Jesus Christ Superstar
Singing talent shows
Television series by ITV Studios
Caiaphas
Cultural depictions of Pontius Pilate
English-language television shows